The Inspector General of Police (IGP) is the senior-most and highest ranked police officer of Nepal and the head of the Nepalese Police Force, who oversees all police activities throughout the country. He reports directly to the Ministry of Home Affairs and is appointed by the Government of Nepal for a tenure of four years, although two IGPs have served for six years.

List of Nepal's IGPs

References